Justice K. S. Radhakrishna  Panicker (born 15 May 1949) is a former judge of the Supreme Court of India. Prior to that, he served as the Chief Justice of Jammu and Kashmir High Court and Chief Justice of Gujarat High Court.

Early life and education
Radhakrishnan obtained master's degree in law in Administrative Law from the Cochin University of Science and Technology. He has also passed Post Graduate Diploma in Constitutional Law from ICPS, New Delhi.

Career
He was enrolled as Advocate on 8 December 1973 and practised in the High Court of Kerala and Subordinate Civil Courts at Ernakulam .Radhakrishnan was Standing Counsel for Cochin University of Science and Technology, State Bank of India, State Bank of Travancore, Kerala State Cooperative Rubber Marketing Federation and State Trading Corporation of India.

Notable cases

He was a part of a two-judge bench of the Supreme Court of India that dealt with "SEBI vs Sahara" case. The bench held that Sahara illegally collected Rs 24,000 crore and ordered it to return all the money to the investors. However, even after more than one and half years Sahara did not follow its orders.  In February 2014, the bench of Justice Radhakrishnan and Justice JS Khehar ordered arrest of Sahara's top management including Sahara's topmost boss Subrata Roy. India's Supreme Court has recognised transgender people as a third gender, in a landmark ruling. In a judgement favouring property development firm DLF in its legal battle against the homeowners association of Silver Oaks society, Gurgaon, Justice Radhakrishnan took a narrow view of common areas, to the detriment of the apartment owners.
Whereas apartment owners contended that the facilities inside their colony belonged to the homeowners association, Justice Radhakrishnan, along with Justice A.K. Sikri of the Supreme Court of India, held that property development companies could legitimately contend that these facilities belong to them instead. In so doing, they overturned a judgement of the Punjab and Haryana High Court, which had taken a liberal view of "common areas", and given relief to the homeowners against the property developer.

He was a part of a two-judge bench of the Supreme Court of India that decided National Legal Services Authority v. Union of India. Decided in April 2014, one month before stepping down as a Supreme Court judge, this 113-page decision declared transgender people to be a 'third gender', affirmed that the fundamental rights granted under the Constitution of India apply to transgender people, and gave them the right to self-identify their gender as male, female or third-gender.

Award

 He received PETA man of the year Award for banning Jallikattu, a bull-taming tradition observed in Tamil Nadu.

Faculty
 Member of Faculty of Law, Cochin University of Science and Technology 
 Fellow of ICPS, New Delhi

References 

1949 births
Living people
Justices of the Supreme Court of India
Chief Justices of the Gujarat High Court
Chief Justices of the Jammu and Kashmir High Court
20th-century Indian judges
21st-century Indian judges